Wharfedale was a rural district in the West Riding of Yorkshire from 1894 to 1974.  It comprised the northern side of lower Wharfedale, the lower Washburn Valley and several parishes between Leeds and the River Wharfe.  Until 1937 it also included a detached part, the parish of Esholt north of Bradford.

It contained the following civil parishes:

Adel cum Eccup (1894–1928) transferred to County Borough of Leeds
Alwoodley (1894–1928) transferred to County Borough of Leeds
Arthington
Askwith
Blubberhouses
Bramhope
Carlton
Castley
Denton
Esholt (1894–1937) transferred to County Borough of Bradford
Farnley
Fewston
Great Timble
Hawksworth (1894–1937) transferred to Aireborough Urban District
Leathley
Lindley
Little Timble
Menston (1894–1937) transferred to Aireborough Urban District
Middleton
Nesfield with Langbar
Newell with Clifton
Norwood
Pool
Stainburn
Weston

It was abolished in 1974 under the Local Government Act 1972, and split between two new districts.  The parishes of Arthington, Bramhope, Carlton and Pool went to the metropolitan district of the City of Leeds in West Yorkshire, with the rest becoming part of the Borough of Harrogate in North Yorkshire.

References

History of North Yorkshire
History of West Yorkshire
Politics of the Borough of Harrogate
Local government in Leeds
Districts of England created by the Local Government Act 1894
Districts of England abolished by the Local Government Act 1972
Wharfedale
Rural districts of the West Riding of Yorkshire